Ian George Prentice (born 9 November 1948) was a member of the Queensland Legislative Assembly.

Biography
Prentice was born in Brisbane, Queensland, the son of Dr. Peter George Driver Prentice and his wife Joan Elizabeth  (née Masters). He attended Shorncliffe State School before completing his schooling at St Paul's School at Bald Hills. He then graduated from the University of Queensland with a LL.B.

Working as a barrister, he also worked for the federal government in census and statistics and was a research officer for John Moore, the federal member for Ryan.

On 2 July 1977 Prentice married Jane Righetti and together had a son and daughter. Jane is the former federal member for Ryan.

Public life
Prentice, representing the Liberal Party, was the member for Toowong in the Queensland Legislative Assembly from 1980 until his defeat in 1983. He was part of the Ginger Group of Liberal politicians who disagreed with a number of actions that the government of which they were a part of.

He served in several roles in the Liberal Party and the government of the day, including:
 State President of the Young Liberal Movement of Australia, Queensland Division – 1976–1978
 Member of the Liberal Party State Executive – 1976–1980
 Member of the Liberal Party Policy Committee – 1976–1980
 Member of the Select Committee on Subordinate Legislation – 1981 
 Member of the Parliamentary Printing Committee – 1981

For his work with the Young Liberals Prentice was awarded a life membership.

References

Members of the Queensland Legislative Assembly
1948 births
Liberal Party of Australia members of the Parliament of Queensland
Living people